Ted James may refer to:

 Ted James (cricketer) (1924–2013), English cricketer
 Ted James (politician) (1918–1995), Lieutenant Governor of Montana from 1965 to 1969
 Ted James (footballer) (1889–1968), Australian rules footballer
 Ted James (American football) (1906–1999), American football player and coach

See also 
 Edward James (disambiguation)